(born January 2, 1931) is a Japanese-born American evolutionary biologist currently affiliated with the Department of Biology at Temple University as a Carnell Professor. He was, until recently, Evan Pugh Professor of Biology at Pennsylvania State University and Director of the Institute of Molecular Evolutionary Genetics; he was there from 1990 to 2015.

Nei was born in 1931 in Miyazaki Prefecture, on Kyūshū Island, Japan. He was associate professor and professor of biology at Brown University from 1969 to 1972 and professor of population genetics at the Center for Demographic and Population Genetics, University of Texas Health Science Center at Houston (UTHealth), from 1972 to 1990. Acting alone or working with his students, he has continuously developed statistical theories of molecular evolution taking into account discoveries in molecular biology. He has also developed concepts in evolutionary theory and advanced the theory of mutation-driven evolution.

Together with Walter Fitch, Nei co-founded the journal Molecular Biology and Evolution in 1983 and the Society for Molecular Biology and Evolution in 1993.

Work in population genetics

Theoretical studies
Nei was the first to show mathematically that, in the presence of gene interaction, natural selection always tends to enhance the linkage intensity between genetic loci or maintain the same linkage relationship. He then observed that the average recombination value per genome is generally lower in higher organisms than in lower organisms and attributed this observation to his theory of linkage modification. Recent molecular data indicate that many sets of interacting genes such as Hox genes, immunoglobulin genes, and histone genes have often existed as gene clusters for a long evolutionary time. This observation can also be explained by his theory of linkage modification. He also showed that, unlike R. A. Fisher's argument, deleterious mutations can accumulate rather quickly on the Y chromosome or duplicate genes in finite populations.

In 1969, considering the rates of amino acid substitution, gene duplication, and gene inactivation, he predicted that higher organisms contain a large number of duplicate genes and nonfunctional genes (now called pseudogenes). This prediction was shown to be correct when many multigene families and pseudogenes were discovered in the 1980s and 1990s.

His notable contribution in the early 1970s is the proposal of a new measure of genetic distance (Nei's distance) between populations and its use for studying evolutionary relationships of populations or closely related species. He later developed another distance measure called DA, which is appropriate for finding the topology of a phylogenetic tree of populations. He also developed statistics of measuring the extent of population differentiation for any types of mating system using the GST measure. In 1975, he and collaborators presented a mathematical formulation of population bottleneck effects and clarified the genetic meaning of bottleneck effects. In 1979, he proposed a statistical measure called nucleotide diversity, which is now widely used for measuring the extent of nucleotide polymorphism. He also developed several different models of speciation and concluded that the reproductive isolation between species occurs as a passive process of accumulation of interspecific incompatibility mutations

Protein polymorphism and neutral theory
In the early 1960s and 1970s, there was a great controversy over the mechanism of protein evolution and the maintenance of protein polymorphism. Nei and his collaborators developed various statistical methods for testing the neutral theory of molecular evolution using polymorphism data. Their analysis of the allele frequency distribution, the relationship between average heterozygosity and protein divergence between species, etc., showed that a large portion of protein polymorphism can be explained by neutral theory. The only exception was the major histocompatibility complex (MHC) loci, which show an extraordinarily high degree of polymorphism. For these reasons, he accepted the neutral theory of evolution.

Human evolution
Using his genetic distance theory, he and A. K. Roychoudhury showed that the genetic variation between Europeans, Asians, and Africans is only about 11 percent of the total genetic variation of the human population. They then estimated that Europeans and Asians diverged about 55,000 years ago and these two populations diverged from Africans about 115,000 years ago. This conclusion was supported by many later studies using larger numbers of genes and populations, and the estimates appear to be still roughly correct. This finding represents the first indication of the out-of-Africa theory of human origins.

Molecular phylogenetics
Around 1980, Nei and his students initiated a study of inference of phylogenetic trees based on distance data. In 1985, they developed a statistical method for testing the accuracy of a phylogenetic tree by examining the statistical significance of interior branch lengths. They then developed the neighbor joining and minimum-evolution methods of tree inference.  They also developed statistical methods for estimating evolutionary times from molecular phylogenies. In collaboration with Sudhir Kumar and Koichiro Tamura, he developed a widely used computer program package for phylogenetic analysis called MEGA.

MHC loci and positive Darwinian selection
Nei's group invented a simple statistical method for detecting positive Darwinian selection by comparing the numbers of synonymous nucleotide substitutions and nonsynonymous nucleotide substitutions. Applying this method, they showed that the exceptionally high degree of sequence polymorphism at MHC loci is caused by overdominant selection. Although various statistical methods for this test have been developed later, their original methods are still widely used.

New evolutionary concepts

Nei and his students studied the evolutionary patterns of a large number of multigene families and showed that they generally evolve following the model of a birth–death process. In some gene families, this process is very fast, caused by random events of gene duplication and gene deletion and generates genomic drift of gene copy number. Nei has long maintained the view that the driving force of evolution is mutation, including any types of DNA changes (nucleotide changes, chromosomal changes, and genome duplication), and that natural selection is merely a force eliminating less fit genotypes (i.e., theory of mutation-driven evolution). He conducted statistical analyses of evolution of genes controlling phenotypic characters such as immunity and olfactory reception and obtained evidence supporting this theory.

Select awards and honors
 2017: John Scott Medal
 2013: Kyoto Prize in Basic Sciences
 2006: Thomas Hunt Morgan Medal
 2002: Honorary Doctorate, University of Miyazaki
 2002: International Prize for Biology, Japan Society for the Promotion of Science
 1997: Member, National Academy of Sciences

Books 
 Nei, M.(2013) Mutation-Driven Evolution. Oxford University Press, Oxford.
 Nei, M., and S. Kumar (2000) Molecular Evolution and Phylogenetics. Oxford University Press, Oxford.
 National Research Council, (1996) The Evaluation of DNA Forensic Evidence. National Academies Press, Washington D.C. 
 Roychoudhury, A. K., and M. Nei (1988) Human Polymorphic Genes: World Distribution. Oxford University Press, Oxford and New York.
 Nei, M. (1987) Molecular Evolutionary Genetics. Columbia University Press, New York.
 Nei, M., and R. K. Koehn (eds). (1983) Evolution of Genes and Proteins. Sinauer Assoc., Sunderland, MA.
 Nei, M. (1975) Molecular Population Genetics and Evolution. North-Holland, Amsterdam and New York.

References

External links

 

Japanese geneticists
Japanese molecular biologists
American geneticists
Statistical geneticists
Living people
Pennsylvania State University faculty
Brown University faculty
University of Texas Health Science Center at Houston faculty
1931 births
People from Miyazaki Prefecture
University of Miyazaki alumni
Kyoto University alumni
Kyoto laureates in Basic Sciences
Members of the United States National Academy of Sciences
Evolutionary biologists
Mutationism
Population geneticists
Japanese emigrants to the United States
American academics of Japanese descent
Temple University faculty
Neutral theory